Solamente para Bajitos is the twenty-eighth studio album and the seventh Spanish language album by Brazilian singer, TV host and actress Xuxa Meneghel. It was released February 12, 2005 by Sony BMG in Argentina. This album marks the return of Xuxa to the Hispanic market, after almost 7 years, and reunites the biggest hits of the last four albums of the XSPB.

Production 
The album reunites re-recordings of the biggest hits of the first four albums of the series Xuxa só para Baixinhos. To perform only for Bajitos, there were seven months of production need. Two months only for recordings of songs per week during music videos recordings, two months to edit and three months to completion. In addition to a team of 80 professionals, including cast, technicians, video, audio, set designers, lighting and cameras. More than two tons of equipment were used in a 1,200 square meter studio.

Release and reception
Solamente para Bajitos album reunites re-recordings of the biggest hits of the first four albums of the series Xuxa Só Para Baixinhos. To realize Solamente para Bajitos, there were seven months of need of production. Two months only for recordings of songs per week during recordings of music videos, two months to edit and three months to completion. In addition to a team of 80 professionals, including cast, video technicians, audio, set designers, lighting and cameras. More than two tons of equipment were used in a 1,200 square meter studio. The album was released in VHS, DVD, CD and also had a promotional version of the CD. To promote his new work, Xuxa went to Buenos Aires and made two presentations, in television programs La Noche del 10 hosted by Diego Maradona and Showmatch with Marcelo Tinelli. Curiously, the song El Trencito did not enter the CD version of "Só para Bajitos". Xuxa gained platinum certification by Argentine Chamber of Phonograms and Videograms Producers (CAPIF), after selling 40,000 copies in Argentina.

The first edition of Xuxa Só Para Baixinhos was released in 2001, winning not only the Brazilian market, but international recognition. The artist was appointed to three Latin Grammy for "Best Children's Album", winning in 2002 with Xuxa Só Para Baixinhos 2, and in 2003 with Xuxa Só Para Baixinhos 3.

Track listing

Personnel

Art Direction: Xuxa Meneghel
General Direction: Xuxa Meneghel
Produced: Luiz Banda Fernandes and Mônica Muniz
Production Director: Junior Porto
Direction of Special Effects: Jorge Banda Fernandes
Production Coordination: Ana Paula Guimarães
Music Production: Ary Sperling
Directed by: Blad Meneghel
Musical Coordination: Vanessa Alves
Recording Engineer: Val Andrade
General Supervision: Susana Piñar
Vocal Preparation of Xuxa: Angela de Castro
Cinematography by: Luiz Leal
Set Design and Art Production: Lueli Antunes
Production of Special Effects: André Lopes (Bokko)
Technical Coordinator: Alfredo Campos
Hair and Makeup: Angélica Gomes and Lau Viana
Choreography: Vagner Meneses (Fly)
Production Support: Eduardo Ramos
Sonoplastia: Leonardo da Vinci (Mikimba)
Edition: Paulo Campos and Isabella Raja Gaboglía
Post Production: Otto Gama, Andrezza Cruzz and Carlos Waldek

References

External links 
 Solamente para Bajitos at Discogs

2005 albums
2005 video albums
Xuxa video albums
Xuxa albums
Children's music albums by Brazilian artists
Spanish-language video albums
Spanish-language albums